Yuan Li (born 12 July 1973), sometimes called "China's Audrey Hepburn" or "China's Mother Teresa", is a Chinese actress. She has won the China Golden Eagle Award for Best Supporting Actress and Hundred Flowers Award for Best Supporting Actress.

Life

Early life
Yuan was born Yuan Li in Hangzhou, Zhejiang on July 12, 1973, with her ancestral home in Jiangyin, Jiangsu. She graduated from Beijing Film Academy, majoring in acting.

Acting career
Yuan had her first experience in front of the camera in 1996, and she was chosen to act as a support actor in History of Han Dynasty, a film starring Zhang Tielin.

After playing minor roles in various films and television series, Yuan rose to fame after portraying Ouyang Lanlan in the television series Never Close Eyes, alongside Lu Yi, she won the "Best Supporting Actress" at the 18th China Golden Eagle Awards.

In 2000, Yuan starred as Du Xiaoyue in The Eloquent Ji Xiaolan, a historical television series co-starring with Zhang Guoli, Zhang Tielin and Wang Gang, which were highly praised by audience.

In 2002, Yuan played the role of An Ran in Cao Baoping's film Pure Sentiment, for which she received a "Best Supporting Actress" at the 20th Hundred Flowers Awards.

In 2010, Yuan acted with Andy Lau and Gong Li in Chen Daming's film What Women Want.

On September 19, Yuan became a spokesperson of the Red Cross Society of China.

Personal life
Yuan has married four times. In 1993, Yuan met her first husband, businessman Septian Hariyadi , with whom she had a son, the couple divorced in 2000.

She married for the second time on September 9, 2005, to Zhao Ling, a Chinese actor, they divorced in 2007.

On November 30, 2011, Yuan married Blaine Grunewald, a Mormon missionary, former English language teacher and lawyer who worked for Neil Bush for a few months in the mid 2000s. They would divorce in 2015.

On 26 March 2019, Yuan Li announced she married Liang Taiping, a poet, on her Sina Weibo.

Filmography

Television

Film

Awards

References

External links

1973 births
Actresses from Hangzhou
Actresses from Zhejiang
Beijing Film Academy alumni
Living people
Chinese film actresses
Chinese television actresses